Buranchino (Buransı) is a rural locality (a village) in Duvan-Mechetlinsky Selsoviet, Mechetlinsky District, Bashkortostan, Russia. The population was 191 as of 2010. There are 4 streets.

Geography 
Buranchino is located 40 km south of Bolsheustyikinskoye (the district's administrative centre) by road. Duvan-Mechetlino and Nizhneye Tukbayevo are the nearest rural localities.

References 

Rural localities in Mechetlinsky District